Hamp may refer to:

People
 Lionel Hampton (1908–2002), American jazz musician
 Hampton Hamp Pool (1915–2000), American football player
 Elijah Hampton Hamp Tanner (1927–2004), American football player, head coach and scout
 Hamp Atkinson (1933–2016), American politician
 Hamp Swain (1929–2018), American radio disc jockey
 Eric P. Hamp (1920–2019), American linguist
 Johnnie Hamp, British retired television producer
 Sheila Ford Hamp (born 1951), American businessperson, principal owner and chairperson of the Detroit Lions of the National Football League
 Sven-Erik Hamp, Swedish periodontist who classified dental furcation defects

Other uses
 Hamp, a version of the Mitsubishi A6M Zero Japanese World War II fighter airplane
 A suburb of Bridgwater in North Petherton, a civil parish in Somerset, England 
 HAMP gene, which codes for the Hepcidin protein
 Home Affordable Modification Program (HAMP), a US government home loan modification program
 Hamp, To open a bag then shake introducing air to open

See also
 River Hamps, Staffordshire, England
 Hemp (disambiguation)
 Hump (disambiguation)

Lists of people by nickname
Hypocorisms